Otto Lington (5 August 1903 - 15 December 1992) was a Danish composer, bandleader and violinist.  Lington was a pioneer of jazz and bandleader for Shirley Bassey, Josephine Baker, and Fats Waller among many others.  Lington is the grandfather of saxophonist Michael Lington.

1903 births
1992 deaths
Male composers
Danish violinists
Male violinists
20th-century violinists
20th-century Danish composers
20th-century Danish male musicians